The 2004 Women's Hockey Olympic Qualifier was held in Auckland, New Zealand from 19 to 28 March 2004. The top five teams qualified to the 2004 Summer Olympics in Athens, Greece.

Squads

Head Coach: Markus Weise

Head Coach: Bobby Crutchley

Head Coach: Riet Kuper

Head Coach: Kazunori Kobayashi

Head Coach: Ian Rutledge

Head Coach: Valentina Apelganets

Head Coach: Lim Heung-Sin

Head Coach: Pablo Usoz

Head Coach: Tetyana Zhuk

Head Coach: Beth Anders

Umpires

Results

Preliminary round

Pool A

Pool B

Ninth and tenth place classification

Fifth to eighth place classification

Crossover

Seventh and eighth

Fifth and sixth

First to fourth place classification

Semifinals

Third and fourth

Final

Awards
Topscorers:  Sakae Morimoto
Best Player:  Tetyana Kobzenko
Fair Play Trophy:

External links
Official FIH website

2004
2004 Women's Field Hockey Olympic Qualifier
2004 in women's field hockey
Field Hockey
Sport in Auckland
March 2004 sports events in New Zealand